Magyarbóly, is a village in Baranya county, Hungary. The actor István Iglódi was born here. Majority residents are Magyars, with minority of Serbs.

At the end of World War II, the Danube Swabians (Schwowe) Inhabitants of this village, was expelled to Allied-occupied Germany and Allied-occupied Austria in 1945-1948, about the Potsdam Agreement.

References

Populated places in Baranya County
Serb communities in Hungary